Okazapamba is a settlement in the Otjinene Constituency in the Omaheke Region of eastern Namibia. It is mostly inhabited by Herero people and a minor group of the San people. The villagers' economic activities concentrate around cattle breeding, as "Herero people are a pastoral cattle breeding nation".

References

External links
 Community Development and HIV/AIDS Grants: U. S. Ambassador Awards

Populated places in the Omaheke Region